Below is a list of notable people from Freetown, Sierra Leone. Please only include entries with a Wikipedia article.

Academics and educators
Edward Wilmot Blyden III, diplomat, political scientist and educator.
Violet Showers Johnson, academic, author and historian.
Aaron Belisarius Cosmo Sibthorpe, nineteenth century historian.
Victor Okrafo-Smart, author and genealogical researcher.
Noah Arthur William Cox-George, academic and economist.
Bertha Conton, teacher, educator, and founder of Leone Preparatory School. 
Eustace Palmer, academic, author and public orator.
Lemuel A. Johnson, academic, poet, and author.
Lati Hyde-Forster, first Sierra Leonean woman to graduate from Fourah Bay College.
William Farquhar Conton, educator, historian, and author. 
Hannah Benka-Coker (born Hannah Luke), educator and founder of Freetown Secondary School for Girls.
Abiodun Williams, academic and former president of The Hague Institute for Global Justice.
Akintola Josephus Gustavus Wyse, academic, author and historian.
Arthur Thomas Daniel Porter III, academic, author and historian.
Edna Elliott-Horton, first West African woman to complete a BA degree  in the Liberal Arts.
James Thomas Roberts, educator and former principal of Methodist Boys High School.
Edward Fasholé-Luke, academic and theologian.
Harry Alphonso Ebun Sawyerr, writer and Anglican theologian.
Eldred Durosimi Jones, academic and literary critic.
Enid Rosamund Ayodele Forde, academic, earth scientist, geographer and first Sierra Leonean woman to earn a PhD.
Trudy Morgan, first African woman to be awarded a Fellowship of the Institute of Civil Engineers.
Reginald Akindele Cline-Cole, academic, earth scientist and developmental geographer.
Thomas Frederick Hope, first Engineer-in-Chief, Guma Valley Water Company and first chairman, Ecobank Transnational Incorporated.

Activists/writers/artists 
Adelaide Casely-Hayford, was an advocate, nationalist,  and educator.
Patricia Piccinini, Australian artist.
FannyAnn Eddy, gay rights activist.
Farid Raymond-Anthony, Sierra Leonean writer, author and poet.
Syl Cheney-Coker, poet, novelist, and journalist.
Thomas Decker, writer, poet, journalist, and linguist.
Eyamide Ella Lewis-Coker (Eyamide Ella Smith), writer and book author.
Gaston Bart-Williams, journalist, novelist and film director.
Emmanuel Bankole Timothy, journalist and biographer.
Raymond Caleb Ayodele Charley, playwright and writer.
Yulisa Amadu Maddy (Pat Maddy), composer, journalist and writer.
Clifford Nelson Fyle, composer of the Sierra Leone National Anthem.
Alphonso Sylvester Lisk-Carew,  prominent photographer appointed for the visit of the Duke of Connaught.

Actors/actresses 
Jeillo Edwards
Desmond Finney
Adetokumboh McCormack

Criminals
Issa Hassan Sesay, convicted war criminal who served in the Sierra Leonean army and the Armed Forces Revolutionary Council (AFRC).
Brima Bazzy Kamara, rebel leader and convicted war criminal.
Santigie Borbor Kanu, rebel leader and convicted war criminal.
Jamil Sahid Mohamed, former businessman, convicted for involvement in assassination plot.

Health care and social justice
Frederica Williams, President and chief executive officer of Whittier Street Health Center in Boston, Massachusetts since 2002.

Military personnel 
Brigadier-General Arthur Nelson-Williams, The Republic of Sierra Leone Armed Forces spokesman
Emmanuel Cole, soldier and hero of the "Gunners Revolt"
John Henry Clavell Smythe, former Royal Air Force navigation officer, barrister and Attorney General of Sierra Leone

Religious leaders
George Gurney Mather Nicol, clergyman and first African graduate of Cambridge University.
Daniel Coker, missionary and founder of the West African Methodist Church.
Thomas Sylvester Johnson, educator and former bishop of Sierra Leone.
Samuel Ajayi Crowther, Sierra Leonean-Nigerian clergyman and first Anglican Bishop of West Africa.
Moses Nathanael Christopher Omobiala Scott, clergyman and Anglican Bishop of Sierra Leone who later became Archbishop of the Province of West Africa.

Musicians 
Ebenezer Calendar, musician who created and popularized Creole gumbe music and maringa music.
Oloh Israel Olufemi Cole (Dr. Oloh), musician. 
Daddy Saj (Joseph Gerald Adolphus Cole), rapper.
Bunny Mack (Cecil Bunting MacCormack), singer.
Emmerson
Reuben Koroma

Judges and lawyers
Nicholas Colin Browne-Marke, judge in the Supreme Court of Sierra Leone and The Gambia.
George Gelaga King, judge presiding at the Special Court for Sierra Leone.
Patrick Omolade Hamilton, Supreme Court judge of Sierra Leone.
Frances Claudia Wright, first Sierra Leonean woman to be called to the Bar in Great Britain and to practice law in Sierra Leone.
Jamesina Essie Leonora King, jurist and first Sierra Leonean sworn in as Commissioner of the African Commission on Human and Peoples Rights.
Ade Renner Thomas, barrister and one-time Chief Justice of Sierra Leone.
James Blyden Jenkins-Johnston, barrister and human rights defender.
John Rosolu Bankole Thompson, jurist, judge and academic.
Stella Thomas, Nigerian of Sierra Leonean descent who was the first West African to qualify as a lawyer.
Gershon Beresford Onesimus Collier, former Chief Justice of Sierra Leone, educator and diplomat.
Christian Frederick Cole, first African barrister to practice in the English courts.
Augustus Boyle Chamberlayne Merriman‐Labor, barrister, writer and munitions worker.
Dame Linda Penelope Dobbs, first non-white person appointed to the senior judiciary of England and Wales.

Politicians
Sir Samuel Lewis, first mayor of Freetown and first West African to receive a knighthood.
Sir Emile Fashole Luke, former Chief Justice and Speaker of Parliament.
Sir Ernest Beoku-Betts, jurist and one-time mayor of Freetown.
Sir Henry Josiah Lightfoot Boston, Governor-General of Sierra Leone from 1962 to 1967
Christopher Elnathan Okoro Cole, one-time Governor-General and Chief Justice of Sierra Leone
Andrew Juxon-Smith, former commander of the Armed Forces and Head of State of Sierra Leone.
Valentine Strasser, Head of State of Sierra Leone from 1992-1996
Herbert George-Williams, former mayor of Freetown
Winstanley Bankole Johnson, former mayor of Freetown
John Henry Malamah Thomas, mayor of Freetown from 1904 to 1912
Eustace Henry Taylor Cummings, mayor of Freetown from 1948-1954
Ade Renner Thomas, current Chief Justice of Sierra Leone
Isaac Wallace-Johnson, a Sierra Leonean journalist and a politician
Siaka Probyn Stevens, Head of State of Sierra Leone from 21 April 1971 – 28 November 1985
Ernest Bai Koroma Is the current Head of State of Sierra Leone and the fourth since 2007
Joseph Saidu Momoh, Head of State of Sierra Leone from 1985 - 1992.
Alhaji Ahmad Tejan Kabbah, third Head of State of Sierra Leone from 1996 to 1997 and again from 1998 to 2007.
Johnny Paul Koroma former Head of State of Sierra Leone and indicted war criminal.

Physicians and surgeons
Abioseh Davidson Nicol, academic, medical doctor and discoverer of the breakdown of insulin in the human body, a breakthrough for the treatment of diabetes.
William Broughton Davies, first West African to qualify as a medical doctor.
Irene Ighodaro (Irene Elizabeth Beatrice Wellesley-Cole), first Sierra Leonean woman to qualify as a medical doctor. 
Edward Mayfield Boyle, medical practitioner and one of the first West Africans to attend Howard University College of Medicine.
William Robert Gorham Ebun Priddy, medical practitioner and Fellow of the Royal College of Obstetricians and Gynaecologists.
James Africanus Beale Horton, surgeon, scientist and political thinker who worked towards African independence a century before it occurred.
Ulric Oduma Emmanuel Jones, first Sierra Leonean neurosurgeon.
Robert Benjamin Ageh Wellesley Cole, medical practitioner and first West African to become a Fellow of the Royal College of Surgeons.
Olayinka Koso-Thomas, medical doctor known internationally for her efforts to abolish female genital mutilation.
John Augustus Abayomi-Cole, medical doctor and herbalist.
George Bernard Frazer, medical practitioner and gynaecologist.

Sports figures

Football (soccer)

Other sports
 Eugenia Osho-Williams, former sprinter and first woman to represent Sierra Leone at the Olympics.
Eunice Barber, former athlete competing in heptathlon and long jump.
Horace Dove-Edwin, retired sprinter who specialized in the 100-metre dash.
Denton Guy-Williams, sprinter at the 1992 Summer Olympics.
Josephus Thomas, sprinter at the 1996 Summer Olympics.
William Akabi-Davis, sprinter at the 1980 Summer Olympics.
Modupe Jonah, middle-distance runner at the 1988 Summer Olympics.
Rudolph George, sprinter at the 1980 Summer Olympics.
Pierre Lisk, sprinter at the 1996 Summer Olympics.
David Sawyerr, sprinter at the 1984 Summer Olympics.
Rachel Thompson, middle-distance runner at the 1988 Summer Olympics.
B. J. Tucker, American football player of the San Francisco 49ers (NFL)
Madieu Williams, American football player of the Cincinnati Bengals
Hawanatu Bangura, Sierra Leonean sprinter
Israel Cole, boxer at the 1984 Summer Olympics.
Joshua Wyse, swimmer at the 2020 Summer Olympics.
Frank Williams, cyclist at the 1996 Summer Olympics.
Egerton Forster, boxer at the 1984 Summer Olympics.
Michael 'Joko' Collier, swimmer at the 1996 Summer Olympics.

 
Freetown